Samuel Edward Mooers (December 14, 1889 – May 5, 1975) was a Canadian politician. He served in the Legislative Assembly of New Brunswick as member of the Liberal party from 1939 to 1952.

References

1889 births
1975 deaths
New Brunswick Liberal Association MLAs